The 2016 Triple J Hottest 100 was announced on Australia Day, 26 January 2017. It is the 24th countdown of the most popular songs of the year, as chosen by the listeners of Australian radio station Triple J.

2016's countdown broke several Hottest 100 records, including number of votes (over 2.25 million), number of songs by Australian acts both in the whole list (66 out of the 100) and at its top (all of the top four), and longest absence between countdowns (16 years for Paul Kelly). With the first-place win of Australian producer Flume for "Never Be like You", 2016 marks a record-breaking fourth consecutive annual countdown in which the number-one track was by an Australian act, after Vance Joy in 2013, Chet Faker in 2014, and The Rubens in 2015. Flume became the first electronic dance music producer to top the countdown.

Background
Triple J's Hottest 100 lets members of the public vote online for their top ten songs of the year, with these votes used to identify the year's 100 most popular songs. Any song that premiered between December 2015 and November 2016 was eligible for 2016's Hottest 100. Triple J published a list of 1,909 eligible songs on their 2016 Voting List. Voting commenced on 12 December 2016, as announced by Dr Karl Kruszelnicki in a nature mockumentary depicting a live music event. The short film featured cameo appearances from many musicians, along with Dr Karl doing a shoey.

Several artists and presenters made their Hottest 100 votes public. The artists most often voted for by Triple J presenters were: D.D Dumbo; Kanye West; Julia Jacklin, who was not ultimately featured in the countdown; and A.B. Original, who are vocal critics of Australia Day (in 2016, Triple J announced a review of the countdown's date in response to criticism from the group and others). On 12 December, bookmakers Sportsbet.com.au and William Hill placed Flume's "Never Be like You" as the song most likely to take out first place by a significant margin, with a Sportsbet representative stating that they have "never seen such a short favourite at this stage".

Voting closed on 23 January 2017. By 25 January, the day before the countdown, bookmakers and media reports identified Flume's "Never Be like You" and Amy Shark's "Adore" as the clear frontrunners for first place.

Full list

Artists with multiple entries

Five entries
 Violent Soho (14, 53, 69, 73, 92)

Four entries
 Flume (1, 8, 37, 95)

Three entries
 Catfish and the Bottlemen (19, 57, 77)
 Safia (26, 85, 89)
 The Avalanches (28, 75, 91)
 Sticky Fingers (29, 36, 51)
 Glass Animals (38, 63, 98)
 The Amity Affliction (65, 67, 76)

Two entries

 Tash Sultana (3, 32)
 Hilltop Hoods (4, 49)
 Montaigne (once solo and once with Hilltop Hoods) (4, 25)
 Childish Gambino (5, 88)
 DMA's (6, 39)
 Illy (7, 23)
 Vera Blue (once solo and once with Illy) (7, 78)
 The Weeknd (10, 41)
 Daft Punk (twice with The Weeknd) (10, 41)
 Nick Littlemore (once with Pnau and once with Empire of the Sun) (11, 93)
 A.B. Original (16, 45)
 Dan Sultan (twice with A.B. Original) (16, 45)
 Kanye West (22, 72)
 Rüfüs (30, 55)
 Drake (31, 99)
 Dune Rats (33, 34)
 Broods (42, 71)
 D.D Dumbo (44, 47)
 Frank Ocean (59, 84)
 Dope Lemon (62, 87)

Countries represented
 Australia – 66
 United States – 21
 United Kingdom – 12
 Canada – 5
 Sweden – 3
 France – 2
 Germany – 2
 New Zealand – 2
 Barbados – 1
 Denmark – 1
 Nigeria – 1

Notes
 The four highest-ranked tracks in the 2016 Hottest 100 were all by Australian artists (excluding the vocal feature of Canadian singer Kai on "Never Be like You"), which marks the longest continuous streak of Australians at the countdown's top, and the first time that the top four songs were by artists from the same country.
 The 2016 list includes four covers recorded for Triple J's Like a Version: the DMA's cover of Cher; the A.B. Original cover of Paul Kelly; the Halsey cover of Justin Bieber; and the Paces cover of L D R U. This breaks the record of three Like a Version covers set by Chet Faker, Chvrches, and Meg Mac in 2014.
 Nine songs in a row were by Australian artists in 2016, between positions #97 and #89, breaking the longest run of eight consecutive Australian songs set in 1999, 2012, and 2014.
 Paul Kelly's feature on the A.B. Original cover of "Dumb Things" set the record for the longest absence between countdowns; Kelly last appeared in the 2000 countdown.
 Earlier in the same countdown, The Avalanches' "Subways" broke the prior record of 13 years for the longest absence between countdowns; they last appeared in 2001.
 The 2016 list features 11 different nationalities, equaling the record set in 1994 and 2015.
 Wizkid's feature on "One Dance" made him Nigeria's first artist to appear in a Hottest 100, and the Hottest 100's first artist representing an African nation since Angélique Kidjo in 1996.
 Rihanna's feature on "Too Good" allowed for the first ever appearance of the established pop star, and of an artist from Barbados, in a Hottest 100.
 Five of Violent Soho's tracks feature in the countdown, making them the first artist with over four tracks in one countdown since Hilltop Hoods in 2006.
 The song "Keeping Score" by L D R U made the countdown for the second consecutive year with a cover by Paces and Guy Sebastian.
 This countdown marks the first time the top three tracks have featured female vocalists.
 Gretta Ray's entry in the countdown with her song "Drive" at #27 marks the best Hottest 100 performance by an Unearthed High winner.

Top 10 Albums of 2016
The annual Triple J album poll was held in December and announced on 18 December. J Award winner D.D Dumbo missed out on the top 10, with his album Utopia Defeated coming in 11th place.

Bold indicates winner.

References

2016 in Australian music
Australia Triple J
2016